The 2007 Autobacs D1 Grand Prix series was the seventh season for the D1 Grand Prix series and was the second season for its spinoff D1 Street Legal.

It was the first time since 2003 that the entire series took place entirely in Japan.

It began on 4 February 2007, as a D1SL exclusive event at Sekia Hills, the mainstay D1GP event opened on 25 March at Ebisu Circuit. At the same year, due to its popularity of its US point scoring round that was held over three seasons, it saw an introduction of its own domestic series, but the series would suffer two setbacks as it suffered from two cancellations, one at Irwindale Speedway on 11 March, due to its Japanese competitors who were to compete, had been building cars specially to compete in the series and could not get the cars ready in time for the event

The D1 US organisation suffered a further blow when due to unresolved issues, the Alameda County Board of Supervisors refused license to the D1 event to take place at Altamont Motorsports Park on 24 June, forcing it to be cancelled.

It was to be the second season for the Malaysian franchise, D1MY; but due to unforeseen circumstances, round 1, which was to take place on March, was cancelled. Nothing has been heard about the organisation since.

The season will be best remembered for the two-car accident between Masato Kawabata and Daigo Saito in Fuji Speedway, when during the sudden death second round, Saito dipped into the inner apex of the 300R corner, causing his car to understeer and collecting Kawabata's Silvia onto the tyre barrier in the process, severely destroyed both cars. Kawabata had a second luck escape as when he collided with the barrier, a nitrous tank housed on the passenger side of his vehicle exploded from the impact, but played no part in Kawabata's injury. Among those narrowly escaping death was Video Option cameraman, Zaku, had to duck to avoid debris from the crash. Both drivers survived without serious injuries, but however Kawabata had to be taken to hospital for treatment for whiplash injuries.

The season will end on 25 November with an end of season All-Star event. The last D1GP event held will be on 21 October at Fuji Speedway and 11 November for D1SL at Sekia Hills.

Changes for the 2007 Season
 The D1 Gals pairing of Kazumi Kondo and Jyuri Tamashiro have now been replaced by a quadruple called the "D1 Sisters" from D-Sign, consisting of Hiromi Goto, Yuria Tachiki, Asami Kikuchi and Ayaka Tashiro. Unlike earlier girls who had a, extensive background as race queens, the group was recruited via auditions.
The final year with Japanese car accessory retailer Autobacs as a title sponsor which was replaced by Sony's Gran Turismo videogame franchise for the All-Star event.

2007 Schedules

2007 D1 Grand Prix Point Series
Round 1 - March 24/25 - Ebisu South Course, Fukushima Prefecture, Japan - Nobushige Kumakubo (GDB)
Round 2 - April 28/29 - Fuji Speedway, Shizuoka Prefecture, Japan - Atsushi Kuroi (PS13)
Round 3 - May 26/27- Suzuka Circuit, Mie Prefecture, Japan - Masao Suenaga (FD3S)
Round 4 - June 9/10 - Sports Land SUGO, Miyagi Prefecture, Japan - Masato Kawabata (S15)
Round 5 - August 25/26 - Ebisu South Course, Fukushima Prefecture, Japan - Ken Nomura (ER34)
Round 6 - September 22/23- Autopolis, Ōita Prefecture, Japan - Masato Kawabata (S15)
Round 7 - October 20/21 - Fuji Speedway, Shizuoka Prefecture, Japan - Masao Suenaga (FD3S)

2007 D1 Street Legal Series
Round 1 - February 3/4 - Sekia Hills, Kumamoto Prefecture, Japan - Kazuya Matsukawa (RPS13)
Round 2 - May 26/27 - Suzuka Circuit, Mie Prefecture, Japan (D1GP Week) - Yukiharu Komagata (GDB)
Round 3 - June 9/10- Sports Land SUGO, Miyagi Prefecture, Japan (D1GP Week) - Jin Horino (S14)
Round 4 - August 25/26 - Ebisu South Course, Fukushima Prefecture, Japan (D1GP Week) - Yukio Matsui (RPS13)
Round 5 - November 10/11- Sekia Hills, Kumamoto Prefecture, Japan - Takashi Hagisako (RPS13)

Exhibition Rounds

D1GP Exhibition
Exhibition 1 - May 4/5 - Old Bridge Township Raceway Park, Englishtown, New Jersey - Nobushige Kumakubo (GDB)
Exhibition 2 - July 13/14 - Las Vegas Motor Speedway, Las Vegas, Nevada - Youichi Imamura (Z33) 
Exhibition 3 - November 24 - Irwindale Speedway, Irwindale, California - Nobushige Kumakubo (CT9A)
All Star Duel - November 25 - Irwindale Speedway, Irwindale, California - Vaughn Gittin Jr. (S197)

Championship Results

Round 1

Round 2

Round 3

note. Tetsuya Hibino was originally awarded second place but was later disqualified after it was revealed that he had deliberately swerved into the path of Suenaga's car before the first corner during a Sudden Death match, causing a collision. Therefore, Hibino was stripped of his position and no second place was awarded.

Round 4

Round 5

Round 6

Round 7

Final Championship Results

D1GP

 Highlighted in blue - 100pt tansou (solo run) bonus
Source: D1GP Official Site 2007 Championship table

D1SL

 Highlighted in blue - 100pt tansou (solo run) bonus
Source: D1GP Official Site 2007 Championship table

See also
 D1 Grand Prix
 Drifting (motorsport)

References

Sources
D1GP.co.jp / D1GP.com

D1 Grand Prix seasons
D1 Grand Prix
2007 in Japanese motorsport